Sara Isaković (born 9 June 1988) is a retired Slovenian swimmer. At the 2008 Beijing Olympics, aged 20, she placed 2nd in the 200 m freestyle with the time of 1:54.97, becoming the second woman ever (behind Federica Pellegrini) to break the 1 min 55 sec mark. It is still, to this day, the only swimming Olympic medal won for Slovenia. Isaković competed for Slovenia at the 2004 Summer Olympics in Athens, the 2008 Summer Olympics in Beijing, and the 2012 Summer Olympics in London.

Early life

Being raised by a Slovenian mother and Serbian father, the family together with her twin brother Gal traveled all around the world due to her father's profession (Pilot/Examiner on Emirates B777). This finally led them to settle in Dubai, where Sara spent most of her childhood. Growing up she attended international schools, with the dream being to one day pursue studies in the U.S. where she could combine both athletics and academics at a world-class level.

College career
After the 2008 Beijing Olympics, she moved to Berkeley, California, where she attended University of California Berkeley and represented the Cal Women's swim team, under the leadership of Teri McKeever, during her college years. In her four years of being a student-athlete, she won three National Team Titles and individually won the 100 butterfly at NCAA's during her Senior year at Cal. Isaković graduated with a degree in Psychology, in May 2013.  Isaković moved to Dubai, where she is building her career in performance psychology and helping performers of all types achieve their maximum potential.

Career achievements

2004- 2x European Junior Champion (Lisbon)

2004- Youngest member of the Athens Slovenian Olympic Team, at the age of 16.

2005- 2 Silver medals at Almeria, Spain, Mediterranean Games.

2005- First Slovenian woman to final at World Swimming Championships, in Montreal. (5th place 200 freestyle)

2007- 7th place in 200 butterfly at Melbourne World Championships

2008- First woman in Slovenian swimming to win a European Championships title- 200 freestyle

2008- Silver Medal at Beijing Olympics

2009- Semi-finalist at World Championships in Rome

2010- Gold medal at University Games, Belgrade- 200 freestyle, Finalist at European Championships

2011- Semi-finalist at World Championships in Shanghai- 200 freestyle

2012- Bronze medalist at European Championships, Debrecen- 4x200 freestyle relay

2012- Semi-finalist at London Olympic Games- 200 freestyle

References

External links
 

1988 births
Living people
Slovenian female swimmers
Olympic swimmers of Slovenia
Slovenian female freestyle swimmers
Swimmers at the 2004 Summer Olympics
Swimmers at the 2008 Summer Olympics
Swimmers at the 2012 Summer Olympics
Olympic silver medalists for Slovenia
California Golden Bears women's swimmers
Slovenian people of Serbian descent
People from Bled
European Aquatics Championships medalists in swimming
Medalists at the 2008 Summer Olympics
Olympic silver medalists in swimming
Mediterranean Games silver medalists for Slovenia
Swimmers at the 2005 Mediterranean Games
Universiade medalists in swimming
Mediterranean Games medalists in swimming
Universiade gold medalists for Slovenia
Universiade silver medalists for Slovenia
Universiade bronze medalists for Slovenia
Medalists at the 2009 Summer Universiade